The Saxony Cup (Sachsenpokal) is a regional German football competition established in 1991 for clubs from Saxony who play in the 3. Liga, Regionalliga Nordost, the NOFV-Oberliga, the Landesliga Sachsen (the Saxon League), the four Landesklassen (formerly known as Bezirksligen) as well as the cup winners of the 13 districts of Saxony. It is one of the 21 regional cup competitions in Germany.

The yearly winners of the Sachsenpokal automatically qualify for the next DFB-Pokal (German Football Cup).

Cup winners
The finals:

Cup winners listed by number of wins
 Twelve wins: Chemnitzer FC
 Four wins: FC Sachsen Leipzig, FC Erzgebirge Aue
 Two wins: VFC Plauen, Dynamo Dresden, RB Leipzig
 One win: VfB Leipzig II, SpVgg Zschopau, Bischofswerdaer FV, Dynamo Dresden II, Chemie Leipzig, Lokomotive Leipzig

References

Sources
Deutschlands Fußball in Zahlen,  An annual publication with tables and results from the Bundesliga to Verbandsliga/Landesliga, publisher: DSFS

External links
Fussball.de: Saxony Cup 

Football cup competitions in Germany
Football competitions in Saxony
Recurring sporting events established in 1991
1991 establishments in Germany